Raymonde Allain (22 June 1912 – 27 July 2008) was a French model and actress. She was Miss France in 1928.  Her participation in the Miss Universe contest drew international media attention, and her controversial loss to American Ella Van Hueson prompted critical dispute over what counted as "real beauty". Allain later wrote an autobiography titled Histoire vraie d'un prix de beauté.

Selected filmography
 The Tunnel (1933)
 The Pearls of the Crown (1937)
 The Paris Waltz (1950)

Bibliography
 Histoire vraie d'un prix de beauté, Gallimard, 1933,

References

External links

1912 births
2008 deaths
French film actresses
French stage actresses
French female models
Actresses from Paris
20th-century French actresses
Models from Paris